Paremhat 1 - Coptic Calendar - Paremhat 3

The second day of the Coptic month of Paremhat, the seventh month of the Coptic year. In common years, this day corresponds to February 26, of the Julian Calendar, and March 11, of the Gregorian Calendar. This day falls in the Coptic Season of Shemu, the season of the Harvest.

Commemorations

Martyrs 

 The martyrdom of Saint Macrobius, Bishop of Nikiu

References 

Days of the Coptic calendar